Daniella by Night (French: De quoi tu te mêles Daniela!, German: Zarte Haut in schwarzer Seide) is a 1961 French-West German spy thriller film directed by Max Pécas and starring Elke Sommer, Ivan Desny and Danik Patisson. It was based on the novel Daniela by Walter Ebert. It was Sommer's first of several spy films, but was largely an exploitation film featuring several nude scenes.

Synopsis
International model Daniella is urgently summoned to Rome to appear for Count Castellani's fashion house after the previous model was murdered. She soon discovers that it is a front for an smuggling operation.

Cast
 Ivan Desny as 	Count Castellani
 Elke Sommer as Daniella
 Danik Patisson as Claudine 
 Helmut Schmid as Karl Bauer
 René Dary as Lanzac
 Sandrine  as 	Mannequin
 Claire Maurier as 	Esmerelda
 Brigitte Banz as Mannequin
 Françoise Alban	
 Jean-Louis Boucher	
 Albert Dinan		
 André Dumas	
 Paulette Frantz		
 Romana Rombach		
 Richard Saint-Bris		
 Pierre Sylvere	
 Roger Trécan

Reception
Writing for The Valley News, Ali Sar criticized the film for its lack of character development and for its loud and disturbing music. He notes that the "exotic dance scenes" have no bearing on the film's plot.

References

Bibliography
 Goble, Alan. The Complete Index to Literary Sources in Film. Walter de Gruyter, 1999.
 Lisanti, Tom & Paul, Louis. Film Fatales: Women in Espionage Films and Television, 1962-1973. McFarland, 2002.

External links
 

1961 films
West German films
1960s French-language films
French thriller films
German thriller films
1960s thriller films
French spy films
German spy films
1960s spy films
Films directed by Rudolf Schündler
Films shot in Rome
Films set in Rome
Films set in Paris
1960s German films
1960s French films
Films based on German novels
Films about striptease

de:Zarte Haut in schwarzer Seide
fr:De quoi tu te mêles, Daniela !